The Yalu River forms part of the China–North Korea border.

Yalu may also refer to:

 Yalu River (Nen River tributary), a river straddling the Chinese regions of Heilongjiang and Hulunbuir near the border with Russia
 Yalu, Iran, a village in Golestan Province, Iran
 Yalu, Mazandaran, a village in Mazandaran Province, Iran
 Yalu, Papua New Guinea, a large village in Morobe Province, Papua New Guinea
 Yalo, or Yalu, village in Palestine, depopulated during the 1967 Arab-Israeli War
 Yalu (iOS), jailbreaking tool for iOS 10
 Common name for Terminalia grandiflora, a tree found in northern Australia